Nikola (Cyrillic: Никола) is a given name.

Nikola may also refer to:

Nikola
 Nikola Corporation, a U.S. vehicle company
 Nikola & Fattiglapparna ("Nikola"), a 2010 album by Nikola Sarcević
 Doctor Nikola, a novel series about an occult anti-hero 
 Nikola (TV series), a German TV series
 Nikola Peak, Ellsworth Mountains, Antarctica; a mountain

Saint Nikola
 Saint Nikola Tavelic (died 1391) Croatian Franciscan friar
 Church of St. Nikola, Dobrelja, Bosnia and Herzegovina
 Abbey of St. Nikola in Passau, Lower Bavaria, Germany
 Sankt Nikola an der Donau (Saint Nikola on the Donau), Perg, Upper Austria, Austria
 Sveti Nikola Island (Saint Nikola Island), Budva, Montenegro; an island in the Adriatic Sea
 Sveti Nikola (village) (Saint Nikola), a village in Kavarna Municipality, Bulgaria
 "Sveti Nikola" (song) (Saint Nikola), a 2009 song by Kerber

Other uses
 Nikola, Prince of Montenegro
 Nikola I (disambiguation)
 Nikola II (disambiguation)
 Nikola III (disambiguation)

See also

 Sveti Nikola (disambiguation)
 Nikola Tesla (disambiguation)
 Nikola I (disambiguation)
 Nikola II (disambiguation)
 Nikola III (disambiguation)
 
 
 Nicola (disambiguation)
 Nicole (disambiguation)
 Nikolai (disambiguation)
 Nicholas (disambiguation)
 Nick (disambiguation)